Laanui may refer to:
Gideon Peleioholani Laanui
Gideon Kailipalaki Laanui
Elizabeth Kekaaniau Laanui
Theresa Owana Kaohelelani Laanui
House of Laanui